"Goin' On" is a song written by Brian Wilson and Mike Love for the American rock band The Beach Boys. It was released on their 1980 album Keepin' the Summer Alive. The single reached number 83 on the Billboard Hot 100.

Record World said that "The Beach Boys have created a majestic ballad that's a perfect piece to usher in the warm weather."

Personnel
Adapted from 2000 liner notes and Craig Slowinski.

Goin’ On
The Beach Boys
Brian Wilson – vocals, tack piano
Carl Wilson – vocals
Al Jardine – vocals
Mike Love – vocals
Bruce Johnston – vocals, Fender Rhodes electric piano, producer

Additional musicians and production staff
Steve Ross – guitar
Bill House – guitars
Bryan Garofalo – bass
John Hobbs – keyboards
Scott Mathews – harmony and backing vocals, drums
Steve Forman – timpani
Steve Douglas – saxophone and saxophone solo
Joel Peskin – saxophone
Dick “Slyde” Hyde – trombone
Chuck Findley – trumpet
Bob Alcivar – horn arrangements
Steve Desper – engineer, mixing

Endless Harmony
The Beach Boys
Brian Wilson – harmony and backing vocals
Carl Wilson – lead vocals, harmony and backing vocals
Al Jardine – harmony and backing vocals
Mike Love – harmony and backing vocals
Bruce Johnston – lead vocals, harmony and backing vocals, Fender Rhodes electric pianos, producer

Additional musicians and production staff
Steve Ross – guitar
Bill House – guitars
Bryan Garofalo – harmony and backing vocals, bass
Ricci Martin - piano
Scott Mathews – drums, percussion 
Steve Forman – percussion 
Steve Desper – engineer, mixing

References

1980 singles
The Beach Boys songs
Songs written by Brian Wilson
Songs written by Mike Love
Song recordings produced by Bruce Johnston
1980 songs